Jozef Valovič (born 9 April 1952) is a Slovak football manager.

He coached Slovan Bratislava, FC DAC  FC Nitra and Senec.

References 

Slovak football managers
ŠK Slovan Bratislava managers
FC VSS Košice managers
FC DAC 1904 Dunajská Streda managers
FC Nitra managers
Living people
1952 births
FK Inter Bratislava managers